The Big Score is a 1983 American crime drama film directed by Fred Williamson. The film has music composed by Jay Chattaway.

Story
A Chicago cop is dismissed from the force unfairly and needs to clear his name. Accused of theft, he goes after people who committed the crime. Now that he is out of the force, he is not bound by the rules as he goes after the drug lord (played by Joe Spinnell). Richard Roundtree and John Saxon appear in the film as his fellow police officers.

Cast
 Fred Williamson as Detective Frank Hooks 
 Nancy Wilson as Angie Hooks
 John Saxon as Davis
 Richard Roundtree as Gordon
 Ed Lauter as Parks
 Michael Dante as "Goldie" Jackson 
 D'Urville Martin as "Easy"
 Bruce Glover as Koslo
 Joe Spinell as Mayfield
 Frank Pesce as J.C.
 Tony King as "Jumbo"
 Chelcie Ross as Hoffa
 Ron Dean as Kowalski
 Greg Noonan
 Jack Wallace
 Joe Krowka

References

External links
 
 

1983 films
1983 crime drama films
1980s English-language films
American crime drama films
Films directed by Fred Williamson
Films scored by Jay Chattaway
Films with screenplays by Gail Morgan Hickman
Films set in Chicago
1980s American films